Salix nipponica is a species of willow native to Eastern Asia.

Range
It is found along rivers and streams in forest regions; near sea level to 500 m. It is found in the Chinese provinces of Hebei, Heilongjiang, Hunan, Jiangsu, Jilin, Liaoning, E Nei Mongol, Shandong, Xizang, Zhejiang. It is also found in Japan, Korea, Mongolia, and the Russian Far East.

Taxonomy
Salix nipponica was formerly treated as S. triandra var. nipponica (Franch. & Savatier) but it is now considered a distinct species.

References

External links 
 
 

nipponica
Flora of China